Hengqin Bridge is a suspension bridge in Zhuhai, Guangdong, China.

Construction started in 1992 and the bridge was completed in 1999. Prior to 2013 it was the only bridge linking the city of Zhuhai and Hengqin.

The bridge carries 6 lanes of traffic of Huandao Road across the Hongwan Waterway, a channel connecting the Xi River/Modaomen River and Praia Grande Bay.

References

Zhuhai
Bridges in China